Route 201 is a state highway in southeastern Connecticut, running in an inverted "L" pattern from Stonington to Griswold.

Route description

Route 201 begins at an intersection with Route 184 in northwestern Stonington and heads north into North Stonington.  In North Stonington, it continues northeast and north, overlapping Route 2 before continuing north into Griswold.  In Griswold, it continues north before turning west past Hopeville Pond. It then intersects I-395 before continuing to end at an intersection with Route 12 in the Jewett City section of Griswold.

History
Route 201 was commissioned in 1934 from an unsigned state road (old SR 663) between Route 165 and Route 138 in Griswold. As part of the 1962 Route Reclassification Act, Route 201 was extended south to Route 2 and north to Jewett City (at Route 12). By 1963, it was extended further south to Route 184 in Stonington, absorbing most of former Route 119 in the process.

Junction list

References

External links

201
Transportation in New London County, Connecticut